The 1970 Nobel Peace Prize was awarded to the American agronomist Norman Borlaug (1914–2009) "for having given a well-founded hope - the green revolution." He is the thirteenth American recipient of the Peace Prize.

Laureate

Norman Borlaug

In 1937, Norman Ernest Borlaug receive his B.S. degree in forestry and Ph.D in plant pathology and genetics at the University of Minnesota in 1942. He became a researcher at the International Maize and Wheat Improvement Center in Mexico where he recommended improved methods of cultivation and developed semi-dwarf, high-yield, disease-resistant wheat varieties, making the make the country self-sufficient in grain from the 1950s onwards. His success in Mexico made him a much sought-after adviser to countries whose food production was not keeping pace with their population grow. During the mid-20th century, Borlaug led the introduction of these methods and researches combined with modern agricultural production techniques to Pakistan and India. The increasing success of wheat productions earned him the title "father of the Green Revolution" and is often credited with saving over a billion people worldwide from starvation. In recognition of his contributions to world peace through increasing food supply, he was given the Nobel Peace Prize by the Norwegian Nobel Committee.

Deliberations

Nominations
Borlaug received five nominations before he was awarded the peace prize. His first nomination came in 1968 by Roscoe L. Barrel of the United States as a joint nominee with the The Rockefeller Foundation. In 1970, he earned two nominations from 14 members of the Swedish parliament and two Norwegian politicians.

In total, the Norwegian Nobel Committee received 70 nominations for 28 individuals and 11 organizations such as Abbé Pierre, Vinoba Bhave, Danilo Dolci, Clarence Streit, Elie Wiesel, UNESCO, the Amnesty International (awarded in 1977) and the Universal Esperanto Association. Twelve were newly nominated such as François Duvalier, Hélder Câmara, Eugene Carson Blake, Isaac Lewin, the International Fellowship of Reconciliation (IFOR) and the International Institute for Strategic Studies (IISS). The most nominated was the Brazilian archbishop Hélder Câmara with nine nominations. There were only two female nominees and both were Swedish: Alva Myrdal (awarded in 1982) and Britta Holmström. Notable figures like Archibald Baxter, Doris Blackburn, Vera Brittain, Charles de Gaulle, Ammon Hennacy, Richard Hofstadter, Edmond Michelet, H. James Shea Jr. and Helene Stähelin died in 1970 without having been nominated for the peace prize.

Norwegian Nobel Committee
The following members of the Norwegian Nobel Committee appointed by the Storting were responsible for the selection of the 1970 Nobel laureate in accordance with the will of Alfred Nobel:

References

External links

1970